Jon Olav Fosse (born 29 September 1959) is a Norwegian author and dramatist.

Biography
Jon Fosse was born in Haugesund, Norway. A serious accident at age seven brought him close to death; the experience significantly influenced his adulthood writing. He enrolled in the University of Bergen and studied comparative literature. His debut novel, Raudt, svart (Red, Black), was published in 1983, written in Nynorsk, one of the two written standards of the Norwegian language. His first play, Og aldri skal vi skiljast (And We'll Never Be Parted), was performed and published in 1994. Fosse has written novels, short stories, poetry, children's books, essays and plays. His works have been translated into more than forty languages. He also played music (the fiddle), and much of his teenage writing practice involved creating his own lyrics for musical pieces. 

Fosse was made a chevalier of the Ordre national du Mérite of France in 2003. Fosse also has been ranked number 83 on the list of the Top 100 living geniuses by The Daily Telegraph.

Since 2011, Fosse has been granted the Grotten, an honorary residence owned by the Norwegian state and located on the premises of the Royal Palace in the city centre of Oslo. Use of the Grotten as a permanent residence is an honour specially bestowed by the King of Norway for contributions to Norwegian arts and culture.

Fosse was among the literary consultants to Bibel 2011, a Norwegian translation of the Bible published in 2011.

Fosse was awarded the 2015 Nordic Council's Literature Prize for the trilogy Andvake (Wakefulness), Olavs draumar (Olav's Dreams) and Kveldsvævd (Weariness).

Numerous of Fosse's works have been translated into Persian by Mohammad Hamed, and his works have been performed in Iran/Tehran main halls.

In April 2022, his novel A New Name: Septology VI-VII, translated into English by Damion Searls, was shortlisted for the International Booker Prize. The book was named a finalist for the 2023 National Book Critics Circle Award in Fiction.

Between working on his novels, Fosse works as a translator on other authors' works.

Personal life
He lives part of the time with his second wife, a Slovak, in Hainburg an der Donau in Austria. He also has a home in Bergen and two homes in western Norway. Originally a member of the Church of Norway (although he described himself as atheist before 2012), he joined the Catholic Church in 2012-2013, and hospitalized himself to rehabilitate his long-term alcohol consumption.

Bibliography

Prose

 Raudt, svart (1983). Red, Black
 Stengd gitar (1985). Closed Guitar
 Blod. Steinen er (1987). Blood. The Stone Is
 Naustet (1989). Boathouse, trans. May-Brit Akerholt (Dalkey Archive, 2017).
 Flaskesamlaren (1991). The Bottle-Collector
 Bly og vatn (1992). Lead and Water
 To forteljingar (1993). Two Stories
 Prosa frå ein oppvekst (1994). Prose from a Childhood
 Melancholia I (1995). Melancholy, trans. Grethe Kvernes and Damion Searls (Dalkey Archive, 2006).
 Melancholia II (1996). Melancholy II, trans. Eric Dickens (Dalkey Archive, 2014).
 Eldre kortare prosa med 7 bilete av Camilla Wærenskjold (1998). Older Shorter Prose with 7 Pictures of Camilla Wærenskjold
 Morgon og kveld (2000). Morning and Evening, trans. Damion Searls (Dalkey Archive, 2015).
 Det er Ales (2004). Aliss at the Fire, trans. Damion Searls (Dalkey Archive, 2010).
 Andvake (2007). Wakefulness
 Kortare prosa (2011). Shorter Prose
 Olavs draumar (2012). Olav's Dreams
 Kveldsvævd (2014). Weariness
Trilogien (2014). Trilogy, trans. May-Brit Akerholt (Dalkey Archive, 2016). Compiles three novellas: Wakefulness, Olav's Dreams and Weariness.
 Det andre namnet - Septologien I-II (2019). The Other Name: Septology I-II, trans. Damion Searls (Fitzcarraldo Editions, 2019).
Eg er ein annan - Septologien III-V (2020). I Is Another: Septology III-V, trans. Damion Searls (Fitzcarraldo Editions, 2020).
Eit nytt namn - Septologien VI-VII (2021). A New Name: Septology VI-VII, trans. Damion Searls (Fitzcarraldo Editions, 2021).

Compilations in English

 Scenes from a Childhood, trans. Damion Searls (Fitzcarraldo Editions, 2018). Collects texts from various sources.
 Melancholy I-II, trans. Damion Searls and Grethe Kvernes (Fitzcarraldo Editions, 2023)

Plays

 Nokon kjem til å komme (written in 1992–93; first produced in 1996). Someone Is Going to Come Home
 Og aldri skal vi skiljast (1994). And We'll Never Be Parted
 Namnet (1995). The Name
 Barnet (1996). The Child
 Mor og barn (1997). Mother and Child
 Sonen (1997). The Son
 Natta syng sine songar (1997). Nightsongs, trans. Gregory Motton (2002).
 Gitarmannen (1999). The Guitar Man
 Ein sommars dag (1999). A Summer's Day
 Draum om hausten (1999). Dream of Autumn
 Sov du vesle barnet mitt (2000). Sleep My Baby Sleep
  Besøk (2000). Visits
 Vinter (2000). Winter
 Ettermiddag (2000). Afternoon
 Vakkert (2001). Beautiful
 Dødsvariasjonar (2001). Death Variations
 Jenta i sofaen (2002). The Girl on the Sofa, trans. David Harrower (2002).
 Lilla (2003). Lilac
 Suzannah (2004)
 Dei døde hundane (2004). The Dead Dogs, trans. May-Brit Akerholt (2014).
 Sa ka la (2004)
 Varmt (2005). Warm
 Svevn (2005). Sleep
 Rambuku (2006)
 Skuggar (2006). Shadows
 Eg er vinden (2007). I Am the Wind, trans. Simon Stephens (2012).
 Desse auga (2009). These Eyes

Compilations in English

 Plays One (2002). Someone Is Going to Come Home; The Name; The Guitar Man; The Child
 Plays Two (2004). A Summer's Day; Dream of Autumn; Winter
 Plays Three (2004). Mother and Child; Sleep My Baby Sleep; Afternoon; Beautiful; Death Variations
 Plays Four (2005). And We’ll Never Be Parted; The Son; Visits; Meanwhile the lights go down and everything becomes black
 Plays Five (2011). Suzannah; Living Secretly; The Dead Dogs; A Red Butterfly's Wings; Warm; Telemakos; Sleep
 Plays Six (2014). Rambuku; Freedom; Over There; These Eyes; Girl in Yellow Raincoat; Christmas Tree Song; Sea

Poetry

 Engel med vatn i augene (1986)
 Hundens bevegelsar (1990)
 Hund og engel (1992)
 Dikt 1986–1992 (1995). Revidert samleutgåve
 Nye dikt 1991–1994 (1997)
 Dikt 1986–2001 (2001). Samla dikt. Lyrikklubben
 Auge i vind (2003)
 Stein til stein (2013)

Compilations in English

 Poems (Shift Fox Press, 2014). Selection of poems, translated by May-Brit Akerholt.

Essays
 Frå telling via showing til writing (1989)
 Gnostiske essay (1999)
An Angel Walks Through the Stage and Other Essays, trans. May-Brit Akerholt (Dalkey Archive, 2015).

Awards and honors

 1998 Nynorsk Literature Prize
 1997 Aschehoug Prize
 1999 Dobloug Prize 
 2003 Norsk kulturråds ærespris 
 2003 Nynorsk Literature Prize 
 2003 Chevalier of the Ordre national du Mérite of France (2003)
 2005 Brage Prize 
 2005 Commander of the Royal Norwegian Order of St. Olav 
 2007 The Swedish Academy Nordic Prize 
 2007 The Federal Ministry of Family Affairs' Deutscher Jugendliteraturpreis 
 2010 The Ibsen Award
 2014 European Prize for Literature
 2015 Nordic Council Literature Prize
 Fosse Foundation (based in Strandebarm) is an organization dedicated to Fosse and his works. The building is located near Fosse's childhood home and a house belonging to his grandparents.

References

External links

 
 Jon Fosse at Doollee.com
 Vincent Rafis, Mémoire et voix des morts dans le théâtre de Jon Fosse, Les presses du réel, Dijon, 2009.
 Andrew Dickson: "Jon Fosse: 'The idea of writing another play doesn't give me pleasure'", The Guardian, 12 March 2014. Retrieved 22 August 2014.

1959 births
Living people
20th-century Norwegian novelists
21st-century Norwegian novelists
Knights of the Ordre national du Mérite
Nordic Council Literature Prize winners
Dobloug Prize winners
Nynorsk-language writers
Norwegian Roman Catholics
Converts to Roman Catholicism from Lutheranism
People from Haugesund
20th-century Norwegian dramatists and playwrights
21st-century Norwegian dramatists and playwrights
Norwegian male novelists
Norwegian male dramatists and playwrights
20th-century Norwegian male writers
21st-century Norwegian male writers